Columbus Messenger Newspapers is a bi-weekly newspaper organization started in 1974. It publishes six free or by subscription, independently owned newspapers: the Westside Messenger, the Canal Winchester Messenger, the Groveport Messenger, the Grove City Messenger , the  South Messenger and the Madison Messenger, covering communities around Columbus, Ohio and Madison County.

Each of the six papers is published every other Sunday and feature happenings with local government, community organizations and human interest stories.

All can be read online at www.columbusmessenger.com

Canal Winchester edition
The Canal Winchester Messenger covers Canal Winchester and is distributed to homes in the Canal Winchester school district, includes drop sites at local businesses and libraries..

Groveport edition
The Groveport Messenger covers Groveport and Obetz and distributed to all Groveport Madison School District homes as well as the city of Obetz.

Grove City edition
The Grove City Messenger Covering all of City of Grove City and Commercial Point.

Westside edition
The Westside Messenger Covering Lincoln Village, Prairie Twp., Westgate, Galloway.

Madison County edition
The Madison Messenger covers Madison County, Ohio, including London, Mount Sterling, West Jefferson, South Solon, Sedalia, Summerford and all rural routes, and distributed to ZIP codes 43140, 43143, 43162, 43153, 43151 and 43064. The Madison Messenger also goes to South Charleston in Clark County the first Monday of each month.

References
Columbus Messenger website

Newspapers published in Columbus, Ohio